Runnells may refer to:
 Runnells, Iowa, a city in Polk County
 Fanny Huntington Runnells Poole (1863–1940), American writer
 Maud Runnells (1934–2002), known as Marion Montgomery, American jazz singer
 Tom Runnells (born 1955), American baseball player and coach
 Runnells Specialized Hospital, a hospital in Berkeley Heights, New Jersey

See also
 Runnels, a surname